David Ruiz may refer to:

David A. Ruiz (born 1973), American judge
David Resendez Ruíz, American plaintiff in Ruiz v. Estelle
David Ruíz (1912–1994), Chilean footballer
David Ruiz (screenwriter) (born 1976), Mexican screenwriter